John James Graham Colclough  (15 October 1883 – 28 April 1954) was an Australian rules footballer who played with Melbourne in the Victorian Football League (VFL).

Family
The son of Richard Colclough (1839–1908), and Jean Colclough (1849–1927), née Graham, John James Graham Colclough was born at Ascot Vale, Victoria on 15 October 1883. 

He married twice:
 He married Mary Grant (1878–1914) on 3 March 1908;  they had two sons: Richard Roy Grant Colclough (1908–1985), and John Graham Colclough (1914–1916).
 He married Annie Isabella McNaughton (1890–1977) in 1925; they had one daughter: Janet Isobel Colclough (1927–), later, Mrs. Dimmick.

Education
Educated at Scotch College, Melbourne, he played with the school's First XVII in 1899, 1900, and 1901.

Football

Melbourne
He played 11 games for Melbourne in 1901, while he was still attending Scotch College (which, at the time, was located in East Melbourne); and, on one occasion, he missed a game because he needed to study for a Monday school examination.

Ballarat
In 1902 he was cleared from Melbourne to play with Ballarat Football Club. He played with the club for four seasons (1902–1905).

Military career
Stating that his occupation was "stock and station agent, he enlisted in the First AIF on 11 November 1915.

He was awarded the Distinguished Conduct Medal (DCM) in 1917. He was awarded the Belgian Croix de Guerre in 1918. He was promoted to Second Lieutenant in April 1918.

Death
He died at Richmond, Victoria on 28 April 1954.

Notes

References
 
 First World War Nominal Roll: Second Lieutenant John James Colclough (5073), Australian War Memorial.
 First World War Service Record: Second Lieutenant John James Graham Colclough (5073), National Archives of Australia.
 Recommendation for the award of Distinguished Conduct Medal (29 September 1917), Collection of the Australian War Memorial: note that the recommendation, mistakenly, has his service number as 5072.
 Distinguished Conduct Medal: (awards announced on 19 November 1917): No.5073 Sergeant J. G. G. Colclough, Infantry, Commonwealth of Australia Gazette, No.95, (Thursday, 27 June 1918), p.1395.
 Decorations Conferred by His Majesty the King of the Belgians: Croix de Guerre: 3rd. Military District: No. 5073 Sergeant John James Graham Colclough, D.C.M., 58th Battalion, Commonwealth of Australia Gazette, No.185, (Wednesday, 27 November 1918), p.2262.
 Australian Imperial Force: A.I.F. Lists 405—408: 3rd Military District: Colclough, No.5073 Sergeant John James Graham, D.C.M., late 58th Battalion (effective 4 November 1918), Commonwealth of Australia Gazette, No.18, (Thursday, 6 February 1919), p.176.

External links 

 
 Graham Colclough: Demonwiki.
 Graham Colclough: australianfootball.com.

1883 births
1954 deaths
Australian rules footballers from Melbourne
Melbourne Football Club players
People educated at Scotch College, Melbourne
Australian military personnel of World War I
Recipients of the Croix de guerre (Belgium)
Recipients of the Distinguished Conduct Medal
People from Ascot Vale, Victoria
Military personnel from Melbourne